Transmission is the debut album by the English punk/metal band Violent Delight, it was released on 15 September 2003 and distributed by WEA records. The album fared poorly on the UK Albums Chart upon release reaching number 96, although it managed to reach number 12 on the UK Rock & Metal Albums Chart.

Track listing

Personnel

Violent Delight
 Rodney Henderson – vocals 
 Ken Hayakawa – drums 
 Ben Macrow – bass 
 Tom Steenvoorden – guitar

Technical personnel 
 Art Direction, Design – Mat Maitland, Richard Andrews (6)
 Artwork [Drawings] – Jody Barton
 Engineer – Dan Korneff (tracks: 1, 2, 4, 12), Paul Hoare* (tracks: 3, 6, 11)
 Engineer [Additional] – Guillermo 'Will' Maya* (tracks: 3, 6, 11)
 Engineer [Assistant] – Dave Chavarri (tracks: 1, 2, 4, 12)
 Keyboards, Programmed By – Omar Clavijo (tracks: 1, 2, 4, 12)
 Mixed By – Eddie Wohl (tracks: 1, 2, 4-12), Paul Orofino (tracks: 1, 2, 4-12), Rob Caggiano (tracks: 1, 2, 4-12)
 Producer – Dave Chavarri (tracks: 1, 2, 4, 5, 10, 12), Steve Jones (2) (tracks: 3, 7, 8, 9, 11)
 Recorded By – Paul Hoare* (tracks: 7, 8)
 Recorded By [Assistant] – Guillermo 'Will' Maya* (tracks: 7, 8)
 Written-By – B. Macrow* (tracks: 2-4, 7-11), K. Hayakawa* (tracks: 1-5, 7-12), R. Henderson* (tracks: 1-12), T. Steenvoorden* (tracks: 1-12)

Charts

Weekly charts

References

2003 albums
Warner Music Group albums
Violent Delight albums